USS Wisconsin (BB-64) is an  and the second ship of the United States Navy to be named in honor of the U.S. state of Wisconsin. She was built at the Philadelphia Naval Shipyard in Philadelphia, Pennsylvania, and launched on 7 December 1943 (the second anniversary of the Pearl Harbor raid), sponsored by Margaret Goodland, wife of Governor Walter Goodland of Wisconsin.

During her career, Wisconsin served in the Pacific theater of World War II, where she shelled Japanese fortifications and screened United States aircraft carriers as they conducted air raids against enemy positions. During the Korean War, Wisconsin shelled North Korean targets in support of United Nations and South Korean ground operations, after which she was decommissioned. She was reactivated on 1 August 1986; after a modernization program, she participated in Operation Desert Storm in January and February 1991.

Wisconsin was last decommissioned in September 1991 after a total of 14 years of active service in the fleet, and having earned a total of six battle stars for service in World War II and Korea, as well as a Navy Unit Commendation for service during the January/February 1991 Gulf War. Wisconsin was stricken from the Naval Vessel Register (NVR) 17 March 2006, and was donated for permanent use as a museum ship. She currently functions as a museum ship operated by Nauticus in Norfolk, Virginia. On 15 April 2010, the City of Norfolk officially took over ownership of the ship.

Construction

Wisconsin was one of the "fast battleship" designs planned in 1938 by the Preliminary Design Branch at the Bureau of Construction and Repair. Her keel was laid down on 25 January 1941, at the Philadelphia Navy Yard. She was launched on 7 December 1943, sponsored by Mrs. Goodland, wife of Walter S. Goodland, the Governor of Wisconsin, and commissioned on 16 April 1944, with Captain Earl E. Stone in command.

With the advent of air power and the need to gain and maintain air superiority came a need to protect the growing fleet of allied aircraft carriers; to this end, Wisconsin was fitted with an array of Oerlikon 20 mm and Bofors 40 mm antiaircraft guns to defend allied carriers from enemy airstrikes. When reactivated in 1986, Wisconsin had her 20 mm and 40 mm AA guns removed, and was outfitted with Phalanx CIWS mounts for protection against enemy missiles and aircraft, and armored box launchers and quad cell launchers designed to fire Tomahawk and Harpoon missiles, respectively.

Wisconsin is numerically the highest-numbered US battleship built.  Although her keel was laid after s, she was commissioned before Missouris commissioning date. Thus, Wisconsins construction began after Missouris, and finished earlier.  Iowa and Wisconsin were finally stricken from the Naval Vessel Register on 17 March 2006, making them the last battleships on a navy list in the world.

World War II (1944–1945)

Shakedown and service with 3rd Fleet, Admiral Halsey
After the ship's trials and initial training in the Chesapeake Bay, Wisconsin departed Norfolk, Virginia, on 7 July 1944, bound for the British West Indies. Following her shakedown cruise (conducted out of Trinidad), she returned to the builder's yard for alterations and repairs.

On 24 September 1944, Wisconsin sailed for the West Coast, transiting the Panama Canal, and reporting for duty with the Pacific Fleet on 2 October. The battleship later moved to Hawaiian waters for training exercises and then headed for the Western Caroline Islands. Upon reaching the Caroline Island Ulithi, she joined Admiral William F. Halsey's 3rd Fleet on 9 December.

Due to the time it took to build her, Wisconsin missed much of the initial thrust into Japanese-held territory, having arrived at a time when the reconquest of the Philippines was well underway. As a part of that movement, the planners had envisioned landings on the southwest coast of Mindoro, south of Luzon. From that point, American forces could threaten Japanese shipping lanes through the South China Sea. In preparation for the coming invasion of Mindoro, Wisconsin was assigned to protect the 3rd Fleet's Fast Carrier Task Force (TF 38), as they conducted air raids at Manila to soften up Japanese positions.

On 18 December, the ships of TF 38 unexpectedly found themselves in a fight for their lives when Typhoon Cobra overtook the force—seven fleet and six light carriers, eight battleships, 15 cruisers, and about 50 destroyers—during their attempt to refuel at sea. The carriers had just completed three days of heavy raids against Japanese airfields, suppressing enemy aircraft during the American amphibious operations against Mindoro in the Philippines. The task force met with Captain Jasper T. Acuff and his fueling group 17 December with the intention of refueling all ships in the task force and replacing lost aircraft. Although the sea had been growing rougher all day, the nearby cyclonic disturbance gave relatively little warning of its approach. On 18 December, the small but violent typhoon overtook the task force while many of the ships were attempting to refuel. Many of the ships were caught near the center of the storm and buffeted by extreme seas and hurricane-force winds. About 790 men were lost or killed, with another 80 injured. Fires occurred in three carriers when planes broke loose in their hangars and some 146 planes on various ships were lost or damaged beyond economical repair by fires, impact damage, or being swept overboard. Wisconsin reported two injured sailors as a result of the typhoon, but otherwise proved her seaworthiness as she escaped the storm unscathed.

Wisconsins next operation was to assist with the occupation of Luzon. Bypassing the southern beaches, American amphibious forces went ashore at Lingayen Gulf, the scene of initial Japanese assaults to take Luzon nearly three years before.

Wisconsin, armed with heavy antiaircraft batteries, performed escort duty for TF 38's fast carriers during air strikes against Formosa, Luzon, and the Nansei Shoto to neutralize Japanese forces there and to cover the unfolding Allied Lingayen Gulf operations. Those strikes, lasting from 3–22 January 1945, included a thrust into the South China Sea, in the hope that major units of the Imperial Japanese Navy could be drawn into battle.

Wisconsins carrier group launched air strikes between Saigon and Camranh Bay, French Indochina, on 12 January, resulting in severe losses for the enemy. TF 38's warplanes sank 41 ships and heavily damaged docks, storage areas, and aircraft facilities. Formosa, already struck on 3–4 January, was raided again on 9 January, 15 January, and 21 January. Throughout January Wisconsin shielded the carriers as they conducted air raids at Hong Kong, Canton, Hainan Island, the Canton oil refineries, the Hong Kong Naval Station, and Okinawa.

Service with 5th Fleet, Admiral Spruance
Wisconsin was assigned to the 5th Fleet when Admiral Raymond A. Spruance relieved Admiral Halsey as commander of the fleet. She moved northward with the redesignated TF 58 as the carriers headed for the Tokyo area. On 16 February, the task force approached the Japanese coast under cover of adverse weather conditions and achieved complete tactical surprise. As a result, Wisconsin and the other ships shot down 322 enemy planes and destroyed 177 more on the ground. Japanese shipping, both naval and merchant, also suffered drastically, as did hangars and aircraft installations.

Wisconsin and the task force moved to Iwo Jima on 17 February to provide direct support for the landings slated to take place on 19 February. They revisited Tokyo on 25 February and hit the island of Hachino off the coast of Honshū the next day, resulting in heavy damage to ground facilities; additionally, American planes sank five small vessels and destroyed 158 planes.

Wisconsins task force stood out of Ulithi on 14 March bound for Japan. The mission of that group was to eliminate airborne resistance from the Japanese homeland to American forces off Okinawa. Enemy fleet units at Kure and Kobe, on southern Honshū, reeled under the impact of the explosive blows delivered by TF 58's airmen. That afternoon, Wisconsin and the task force retired from Kyūshū, screening the blazing and battered flattop, and shooting down 48 attackers.

On 24 March, Wisconsin trained her  guns on targets ashore on Okinawa. Together with the other battleships of the task force, she pounded Japanese positions and installations in preparation for the landings. Japanese resistance, while fierce, was doomed to failure by dwindling numbers of aircraft and trained pilots.

Combat air patrol (CAP) shot down 15 enemy planes, and ships' gunfire shot down another three, but not before one kamikaze attack penetrated the CAP and screen to crash on the flight deck of the fleet carrier . On 11 April, the Japanese renewed their kamikaze attacks; and only drastic maneuvers and heavy barrages of gunfire saved the task force. CAP shot down 17 planes, and ships' gunfire shot down 12. The next day, 151 enemy aircraft attacked TF 58, but Wisconsin, together with other units of the screens for the vital carriers, kept the kamikaze pilots at bay and destroyed them before they could reach their targets. Over the days that ensued, Japanese kamikaze attacks managed to crash into three carriers—, and —on successive days.

By 4 June, a typhoon was swirling through the fleet. Wisconsin rode out the storm unscathed, but three cruisers, two carriers, and a destroyer suffered serious damage. Offensive operations were resumed on 8 June with a final aerial assault on Kyūshū. The Japanese aerial response was virtually nonexistent; 29 planes were located and destroyed. On that day, one of Wisconsins floatplanes landed and rescued a downed pilot from the carrier .

Bombardment of Japan

Wisconsin ultimately put into Leyte Gulf and dropped anchor there on 13 June for repairs and replenishment. Three weeks later, on 1 July, the battleship and her escorts sailed once more for Japanese home waters for carrier air strikes on the enemy's heartland. Nine days later, carrier planes from TF 38 destroyed 72 enemy aircraft on the ground and smashed industrial sites in the Tokyo area. Wisconsin and the other ships made no attempt whatsoever to conceal the location of their armada, due in large part to a weak Japanese response to their presence.

On 16 July, Wisconsin fired her  guns at the steel mills and oil refineries at Muroran, Hokkaido. Two days later, she wrecked industrial facilities in the Hitachi Miro area, on the coast of Honshū, northeast of Tokyo itself. During that bombardment, British battleships of the British Pacific Fleet contributed their heavy shellfire. By that point in the war, Allied warships such as Wisconsin were able to shell the Japanese homeland almost at will.

TF 38's planes subsequently blasted the Japanese naval base at Yokosuka, and put the former fleet flagship , one of the two remaining Japanese battleships, out of action. Throughout July and into August, Admiral Halsey's airmen visited destruction upon the Japanese, the last instance being against Tokyo on 13 August. Two days later, the Japanese surrendered, ending World War II.

Wisconsin, as part of the occupying force, arrived at Tokyo Bay on 5 September, three days after the formal surrender occurred on board the battleship . During Wisconsins brief career in World War II, she had steamed  since commissioning, shot down three enemy planes, claimed assists on four occasions, and  fueled her screening destroyers on some 250 occasions.

Post World War II (1945–1950)
Shifting subsequently to Okinawa, the battleship embarked homeward-bound GIs on 22 September 1945, as part of Operation Magic Carpet staged to bring soldiers, sailors, and marines home from the far-flung battlefronts of the Pacific. Departing Okinawa on 23 September, Wisconsin reached Pearl Harbor on 4 October, remaining there for five days before she pushed on for the West Coast on the last leg of her state-side bound voyage. She reached San Francisco on 15 October.

Heading for the East Coast of the United States soon after the start of the new year, 1946, Wisconsin transited the Panama Canal from 11 to 13 January and reached Hampton Roads, Virginia, on 18 January. Following a cruise south to Guantánamo Bay, Cuba, the battleship entered the Norfolk Naval Shipyard for overhaul. After repairs and alterations that consumed the summer, Wisconsin sailed for South American waters.

Over the weeks that ensued, the battleship visited Valparaíso, Chile, from 1–6 November; Callao, Peru, from 9–13 November; Balboa, Canal Zone, from 16 to 20 November; and La Guaira, Venezuela, from 22 to 26 November, before returning to Norfolk on 2 December 1946.

Wisconsin spent nearly all of 1947 as a training ship, taking naval reservists on two-week cruises throughout the year. Those voyages commenced at Bayonne, New Jersey, and saw visits conducted at Guantánamo Bay, Cuba, and the Panama Canal Zone. While underway at sea, the ship would perform various drills and exercises before the cruise would end where it had started, at Bayonne. During June and July 1947, Wisconsin took United States Naval Academy midshipmen on cruises to northern European waters.

In January 1948, Wisconsin reported to the Atlantic Reserve Fleet at Norfolk for inactivation. Placed out of commission, in reserve on 1 July, Wisconsin was assigned to the Norfolk group of the Atlantic Reserve Fleet.

Korean War (1950–1952)

Her sojourn in "mothballs" was rather brief, due to the North Korean invasion of South Korea in late June 1950. Wisconsin was recommissioned on 3 March 1951 with Captain Thomas Burrowes in command. After shakedown training, the revitalized battleship conducted two midshipmen training cruises, taking the officers-to-be to Edinburgh, Scotland; Lisbon, Portugal; Halifax, Nova Scotia; New York City and Guantánamo Bay, Cuba before she returned to Norfolk. While leaving New York, Wisconsin was accidentally grounded on mud flats in New York Harbor, but was freed on 23 August 1951 with no damage to the ship.

Wisconsin departed Norfolk on 25 October, bound for the Pacific. She transited the Panama Canal on 29 October and reached Yokosuka, Japan on 21 November. There she relieved  as flagship for Vice Admiral H. M. Martin, Commander 7th Fleet.

On 26 November, with Vice Admiral Martin and Rear Admiral F.P. Denebrink, Commander, Service Force Pacific embarked, Wisconsin departed Yokosuka for Korean waters to support the fast carrier operations of TF 77. She left the company of the carrier force on 2 December, and screened by the destroyer , provided gunfire support for the Republic of Korea (ROK) Corps in the Kasong-Kosong area. After disembarking Admiral Denebrink on 3 December at Kangnung, the battleship resumed station on the Korean "bombline", providing gunfire support for the American 1st Marine Division. Wisconsins shelling accounted for a tank, two gun emplacements, and a building. She continued her gunfire support task for the 1st Marine Division and 1st ROK Corps through 6 December, accounting for enemy bunkers, artillery positions, and troop concentrations. On one occasion during that time, the battleship received a request for call-fire support and provided three star-shells for the 1st ROK Corps, illuminating an enemy attack that was consequently repulsed with a considerable number of enemy casualties.

After being relieved on the gunline by the heavy cruiser  on 6 December, Wisconsin briefly retired from gunfire-support duties. She resumed them in the Kasong-Kosong area on 11 December screened by the destroyer . The following day, 12 December, had the helicopter embarkation on Wisconsin of Rear Admiral H. R. Thurber, Commander Battleship Division 2 (BatDiv 2), as part of his inspection trip in the Far East.

Wisconsin continued her naval gunfire-support duties on the bombline, shelling enemy bunkers, command posts, artillery positions, and trench systems through 14 December. She departed the "bombline" on that day to render special gunfire support duties in the Kojo area shelling coastal targets in support of United Nations (UN) troops ashore. That same day, Wisconsin returned to the Kasong-Kosong area. On 15 December, she disembarked Admiral Thurber by helicopter. The next day, Wisconsin departed Korean waters, heading for Sasebo to rearm.

Returning to the combat zone on 17 December, Wisconsin embarked United States Senator Homer Ferguson of Michigan on 18 December. That day, the battleship supported the 11th ROK invasion with night illumination fire that enabled the ROK troops to repulse a North Korean assault with heavy enemy casualties. Departing the "bombline" on 19 December, the battleship transferred Ferguson by helicopter to the carrier .

On 20 December, Wisconsin participated in a coordinated air-surface bombardment of Wonsan to neutralize selected targets in its area. The ship shifted its bombardment station to the western end of Wonsan harbor, hitting boats and small craft in the inner swept channel with her 5-inch (127 mm) guns during the afternoon and helping forestall attempts to assault the friendly-held islands nearby. Wisconsin then made an antiboat sweep to the north, firing her 5-inch batteries on suspected boat concentrations. She then provided gunfire support to UN troops operating at the bombline until 22 December, when she rejoined the carrier task force.

On 28 December, Cardinal Francis Spellman, on a Korean tour over the Christmas holidays, helicoptered aboard the ship to celebrate Mass for Catholic crew members. He left as he came, off Pohang. On New Year's Eve day, Wisconsin put into Yokosuka.

Wisconsin departed that port on 8 January 1952 and returned to Korean waters. She reached Pusan the following day and entertained the president of South Korea, Syngman Rhee, and his wife, on 10 January. The couple received full military honors as they came aboard, which Rhee reciprocated by awarding Vice Admiral Martin the ROK Order of the Military Merit.

Wisconsin returned to the bombline on 11 January, and over the ensuing days, delivered heavy gunfire support for the 1st Marine Division and the 1st ROK Corps. As before, her primary targets were command posts, shelters, bunkers, troop concentrations, and mortar positions. As before, she stood ready to deliver call-fire support as needed, shelling enemy troops in the open on 14 January at the request of the ROK 1st Corps.

Rearming once more at Sasebo, she shortly joined TF 77 off the coast of Korea and resumed support at the bombline on 23 January. Three days later, she shifted again to the Kojo region, to participate in a coordinated air and gun strike. That same day, the battleship returned to the bombline and shelled the command post and communications center for the 15th North Korean Division during call-fire missions for the 1st Marine Division.

Returning to Wonsan at the end of January, Wisconsin bombarded enemy guns at Hodo Pando before she was rearmed at Sasebo. The battleship rejoined TF 77 on 2 February, and the next day blasted railway buildings and marshaling yards at Hodo Pando and Kojo before rejoining TF 77. After replenishment at Yokosuka a few days later, she returned to the Kosong area and resumed gunfire support. During that time, she destroyed railway bridges and a small shipyard while conducting call-fire missions on enemy command posts, bunkers, and personnel shelters, making numerous cuts on enemy trench lines in the process.

On 26 February, Wisconsin arrived at Pusan, where Vice Admiral Shon, the ROK chief of naval operations, United States Ambassador J.J. Muccio and Rear Admiral Scott-Montcrief, Royal Navy, Commander, Task Group 95.12 (TG 95.12) visited the battleship. Departing that South Korean port the following day, Wisconsin reached Yokosuka on 2 March. A week later, she shifted to Sasebo to prepare to return to Korean waters.

Wisconsin arrived off Songjin, Korea, on 15 March and concentrated her gunfire on enemy railway transport. Early that morning, she destroyed a communist troop train trapped outside a destroyed tunnel. That afternoon, she received the first direct hit in her history, when one of four shells from a North Korean 155 mm gun battery struck the shield of a starboard 40 mm mount. Although little material damage resulted, three men were injured. Wisconsin subsequently destroyed that battery with a full 16-inch (406 mm) salvo before continuing her mission. After again supporting 1st Marine Division with her heavy rifles, the battleship returned to Japan on 19 March.

Relieved as flagship of the 7th Fleet on 1 April by sister ship , Wisconsin departed Yokosuka, bound for the United States. She continued her homeward-bound voyage via Pearl Harbor and arrived at Long Beach, California, on 19 April before continuing on for Norfolk.

After the Korean War (1952–1981)

On 9 June, Wisconsin resumed her role as a training ship, taking midshipmen to Greenock, Scotland, Brest, France, and Guantánamo Bay, Cuba, before returning to Norfolk. She departed Hampton Roads on 25 August and participated in the NATO exercise Operation Mainbrace, which was held out of Greenock, Scotland. After her return to Norfolk, Wisconsin underwent an overhaul in the naval shipyard there. Wisconsin remained in the Atlantic fleet throughout 1952 and into 1953, training midshipmen and conducting exercises. After a month of routine maintenance Wisconsin departed Norfolk on 9 September 1953, bound for the Far East.

Sailing via the Panama Canal to Japan, Wisconsin relieved  as 7th Fleet flagship on 12 October. During the months that followed, Wisconsin visited the Japanese ports of Kobe, Sasebo Navy Yard, Yokosuka, Otaru, and Nagasaki. She spent Christmas at Hong Kong and was ultimately relieved of flagship duties on 1 April 1954 and returned to the United States soon thereafter, reaching Norfolk, via Long Beach and the Panama Canal, on 4 May.

Entering the Norfolk Naval Shipyard on 11 June, Wisconsin underwent a brief overhaul and commenced a midshipman training cruise on 12 July. After revisiting Greenock, Brest, and Guantánamo Bay, the ship returned to the Norfolk Naval Shipyard for repairs. Shortly thereafter, Wisconsin participated in Atlantic Fleet exercises as flagship for the commander, Second Fleet. Departing Norfolk in January 1955, Wisconsin took part in Operation Springboard, during which she visited Port-au-Prince, Haiti. Then, upon returning to Norfolk, the battleship conducted another midshipman's cruise that summer, visiting Edinburgh, Copenhagen, Denmark, and Guantánamo Bay before returning to the United States.

Upon completion of a major overhaul at the New York Naval Shipyard, Wisconsin headed south for refresher training in the Caribbean Sea, later taking part in another Springboard exercise. During that cruise, she again visited Port-au-Prince and added Tampico, Mexico, and Cartagena, Colombia, to her list of ports of call. She returned to Norfolk on the last day of March 1955 for local operations. On 19 October, while operating in the East River in New York Harbor, Wisconsin was accidentally grounded, but the ship was freed in about an hour without any serious damage.

Throughout April 1956 and into May, Wisconsin operated locally off the Virginia Capes. On 6 May, the battleship collided with the destroyer  in a heavy fog; Wisconsin put into Norfolk with extensive damage to her bow, and one week later entered dry dock at the Norfolk Naval Shipyard. A novel experiment sped her repairs and enabled the ship to carry out her scheduled midshipman training cruise that summer. A 120-ton, 68 foot (21 m) section of the bow of Wisconsins incomplete sister ship  was transported by barge, in one section, from Newport News Shipbuilding and Drydock Corporation of Newport News, Virginia, across Hampton Roads to the Norfolk Naval Shipyard. Working around the clock, Wisconsins ship's force and shipyard personnel completed the operation that grafted on the new bow in 16 days. On 28 June 1956, the ship was ready for sea.

Wisconsin resumed her midshipman training on 9 July 1956. That autumn, Wisconsin participated in Atlantic Fleet exercises off the coast of the Carolinas, returning to port on 8 November 1956. Entering the Norfolk Naval Shipyard a week later, the battleship underwent major repairs that were not finished until 2 January 1957.

After local operations off the Virginia capes on 3–4 January 1957 and from 9–11 January, Wisconsin departed Norfolk on 16 January, reporting to the commander, Fleet Training Group, at Naval Station Guantánamo Bay. Wisconsin served as Admiral Henry Crommelin's flagship during the ensuing shore bombardment practices and other exercises held off the isle of Culebra, Puerto Rico, from 2–4 February. Sailing for Norfolk upon completion of the training period, the battleship arrived on 7 February and resumed local operations off Norfolk. On 27 March, Wisconsin sailed for the Mediterranean Sea, reaching Gibraltar on 6 April, she pushed on that day to rendezvous with TF 60 in the Aegean Sea before reporting to Turkey for the NATO exercise Red Pivot.

Departing Xeros Bay on 14 April, she arrived at Naples four days later, and conducted exercises in the eastern Mediterranean. In the course of those operational training evolutions, she rescued a pilot and crewman who survived the crash of a plane from the aircraft carrier . Wisconsin reached Valencia, Spain, on 10 May, and three days later, entertained prominent civilian and military officials of the city.

Departing Valencia on 17 April, Wisconsin reached Norfolk on 27 May. En route, she was called upon to sink a Boeing KC-97F-55-BO Stratofreighter, 51-0258, which had ditched in the Atlantic  on 9 May, 550 km (343.8 mi) southeast of the Azores Islands following a double engine failure, and subsequently floated for 10 days.

On 27 May, Rear Admiral L.S. Parks relieved Rear Admiral Crommelin as Commander, BatDiv 2. Departing Norfolk on 19 June, the battleship, over the ensuing weeks, conducted a midshipman training cruise through the Panama Canal to South American waters, and reached Valparaiso on 3 July. Eight days later, the battleship headed back to the Panama Canal and the Atlantic.

After exercises at Guantánamo Bay and off Culebra, Wisconsin reached Norfolk on 5 August and conducted local operations that lasted into September. She then participated in NATO exercises, which took her across the North Atlantic to the British Isles.

Wisconsins days as an active fleet unit were numbered, and she prepared to make her last cruise. On 4 November, she departed Norfolk with a large group of prominent guests on board. Reaching New York City on 6 November, the battleship disembarked her guests, and on 8 November, headed for Bayonne, New Jersey, to commence a preinactivation overhaul. She was placed out of commission at Bayonne on 8 March 1958, and joined the United States Navy reserve fleet (better known as the "mothball fleet") there, leaving the Navy without an active battleship for the first time since 1895. Subsequently, taken to the Philadelphia Naval Shipyard, Wisconsin remained there with her sister ship Iowa into the 1980s. While berthed in the Philadelphia Naval Yard, an electrical fire damaged the ship and left her as the Iowa-class battleship in the worst material condition prior to her 1980s reactivation.

Reactivation (1986–1990)

As part of President Ronald Reagan's Navy Secretary John F. Lehman's effort to create a "600-ship Navy," Wisconsin was reactivated 1 August 1986, a precommissioning unit (PCU) crew established, and the ship moved under tow to the Avondale Shipyard in New Orleans, Louisiana, to commence pre-recommissioning workups. The battleship was then towed from the Avondale Shipyard and arrived at Ingalls Shipbuilding in Pascagoula, Mississippi, on 2 January 1987 to receive weapons system upgrades for her modernization. During the modernization, Wisconsin had all of her remaining 20 mm Oerlikon and 40 mm Bofors antiaircraft guns removed, due to their ineffectiveness against modern jet fighters and enemy antiship missiles; additionally, the two  gun mounts located at midship and in the aft on the port and starboard sides of the battleship were removed.

Over the next several months, the ship was upgraded with the most advanced weaponry available.  Among the new weapon systems installed were four MK 141 quad cell launchers for 16 RGM-84 Harpoon antiship missiles, eight armored box launcher mounts for 32 BGM-109 Tomahawk missiles, and four of the United States Navy's Phalanx Close-in weapon system 20 mm Gatling guns for defense against enemy antiship missiles and enemy aircraft. Wisconsin also received eight RQ-2 Pioneer unmanned aerial vehicles, remotely controlled drones that replaced the helicopters previously used to spot for her nine  guns. Also included in her modernization were upgrades to radar and fire control systems for her guns and missiles, and improved electronic warfare capabilities. Armed as such, Wisconsin was formally recommissioned on 22 October 1988 in Pascagoula, Mississippi, under the command of Captain Jerry M. Blesch, USN. Assigned to the United States Atlantic Fleet, she was subsequently homeported at Naval Station Norfolk, Virginia, where she became the centerpiece of her own surface action group (SAG), also referred to as a battleship battle group (BBBG).

Wisconsin spent the first part of 1989 conducting training exercises in the Atlantic Ocean and off the coast of Puerto Rico before returning to the Philadelphia Naval Shipyard for a post-recommissioning shakedown that lasted the rest of the year. In mid-1990, the battleship participated in a fleet exercise.

Gulf War (January/February 1991)

On 2 August 1990, Iraq invaded Kuwait. In the middle of the month, President George H. W. Bush, in keeping with the Carter Doctrine, sent the first of several hundred thousand troops, along with a strong force of naval support, to Saudi Arabia and the Persian Gulf area to support a multinational force in a standoff with Iraqi dictator Saddam Hussein. On 7 August, Wisconsin and her battle group were ordered to deploy in defense of Kuwait for Operation Desert Shield, and they arrived in the Persian Gulf on 23 August. On 15 January 1991, Operation Desert Storm commenced operations, and Wisconsin found herself serving alongside her sister Missouri, just as she had done in Korea 40 years previously. Both Wisconsin and Missouri launched Tomahawk missile attacks against Iraq; they were among the first ships to fire cruise missiles during the 1991 Gulf War. Wisconsin served as the Tomahawk Land Attack Missile (TLAM) strike commander for the Persian Gulf, directing the sequence of launches that marked the opening of Operation Desert Storm and firing a total of 24 of her own TLAMs during the first two days of the campaign. Wisconsin also assumed the responsibility of the local antisurface warfare coordinator for the Northern Persian Gulf Surface Action Group.

The most recently recommissioned battleship sent 11 shells  to destroy an Iraqi artillery battery in southern Kuwait during a mission called in by USMC OV-10 Bronco aircraft. Using an RQ-2 Pioneer UAV as a spotter in combat for the first time, Wisconsin pounded an Iraqi communications compound on 7 February. Her main guns lobbed 24 shells on Iraqi artillery sites, missile facilities, and electronic-warfare sites along the coast. That evening, she targeted naval sites with her  guns, firing 50 rounds, which severely damaged or sank 15 Iraqi boats, and destroyed several piers at the Khawr al-Mufattah marina. In response to calls for fire support from US and coalition forces, Wisconsins main battery was used again on 9 February, blasting bunkers and artillery sites, and shelling Iraqi troop positions near Khafji after the Iraqis were ousted from the city by Saudi and Qatari armor. On 21 February, one of Wisconsins UAVs observed several trucks resupplying an Iraqi command post; in response, Wisconsin trained her  guns on the complex, leveling or heavily damaging 10 of the buildings. Wisconsin and Missouri alternated positions on the gun line, using their  guns to destroy enemy targets and soften defenses along the Kuwait coastline for a possible amphibious assault.

On the night of 23 February, Missouri and Wisconsin turned their big guns on Kuwait's Faylaka Island to support the US-led coalition ground offensive to free Kuwait from the Iraqi occupation forces. The two ships were to conduct a diversionary assault aimed at convincing the Iraqi forces arrayed along the shores of Faylaka Island that coalition forces were preparing to launch an amphibious invasion. As part of this attack, Missouri and Wisconsin were directed to shell known Iraqi defensive positions on the island. Shortly after Missouri completed her shelling of Faylaka Island, Wisconsin, while still over the horizon (and thus out of visual range of the Iraqi forces) launched her RQ-2 Pioneer Unmanned Aerial Vehicle to spot for her  guns. As Wisconsins drone approached Faylaka Island, the pilot of the drone was instructed to fly the vehicle low over Iraqi positions so that the soldiers would know that they were once again being targeted by a battleship. Iraqi troops on the ground heard the Pioneer's distinctive buzzing sound, and having witnessed the effects of Missouris artillery strike on their trench line, the Iraqi troops decided to signal their willingness to surrender by waving makeshift white flags, an action dutifully noted aboard Wisconsin. Amused at this sudden development, the men assigned to the drone's aircrew called Wisconsins commanding officer, Captain David S. Bill III, and asked, "Sir, they want to surrender, what should I do with them?" This surrender to Wisconsins Pioneer has since become one of the most remembered moments of the Gulf War; the incident was also the first-ever surrender of enemy troops to an unmanned aircraft controlled by a ship. Wisconsin drone also carried out a number of reconnaissance missions on occupied Kuwait before the coalition's ground offensive.

The next day, Wisconsin answered two separate call-fire support missions for coalition forces by suppressing Iraqi troops barricaded in two bunkers. After witnessing the effects of Wisconsins strike against the Iraqi positions, an elated Saudi marine commander commented over the radio, "I wish we had a battleship in our navy."

Both Wisconsin and Missouri delivered more than 1 million pounds of ordnance on Iraqi targets by the time President George H. W. Bush ended hostilities on 28 February. With one last salvo from her big guns, Wisconsin fired the last naval gunfire-support mission of the war, and thus was the final battleship in world history to see action. Wisconsin remained in the Persian Gulf after the cease-fire took effect, and returned home on 28 March 1991. During the eight months Wisconsin spent in the Persian Gulf, she had flown 348 UAV hours, recorded 661 safe helicopter landings, steamed , fired 319  rounds, 881  rounds, and 5,200 20 mm Phalanx CIWS rounds, and launched 24 Tomahawk cruise missiles. Since all four remaining battleships were decommissioned and stricken following the Gulf War, this was the last time that United States battleships actively participated in a war.

Museum ship (1992–present)

With the collapse of the Soviet Union in the early 1990s and the absence of a perceived threat to the United States came drastic cuts in the defense budget. The high cost of maintaining and operating battleships as part of the United States Navy's active fleet became uneconomical; as a result, Wisconsin was decommissioned on 30 September 1991 after 14 total years of active service, and joined the Reserve Fleet at the Philadelphia Naval Shipyard.  She was stricken from the Naval Vessel Register (NVR) on 12 January 1995, then on 15 October 1996, she was moved to the Norfolk Naval Shipyard, and on 12 February 1998, she was restored to the Naval Vessel Register. On 7 December 2000, the battleship was towed from Portsmouth, Virginia, and berthed adjacent to Nauticus, The National Maritime Center in Norfolk. On 16 April 2001 the battleship's weather decks were opened to the public by the Hampton Roads Naval Museum, a U.S. Navy museum charged with Wisconsins interpretation and public visitation. The ship was still owned by the Navy and was considered part of the mothball fleet.

Wisconsin was named (along with ) as one of two US Navy battleships to be maintained in the United States Navy reserve fleets in accordance with the National Defense Authorization Act of 1996 as shore-bombardment vessels.  However, Wisconsin was then over 60 years old and would have required extensive modernization to return to the fleet since most of her technology dated back to World War II, and the missile and electronic-warfare equipment added to the battleship during her 1988–89 modernization were considered obsolete. In addition, the cost of modernizing the battleships was estimated to be around $500 million for reactivation and $1.5 billion for a full modernization program.

On 17 March 2006, the Secretary of the Navy exercised his authority to strike Iowa and Wisconsin from the NVR, which cleared the way for both ships to be donated for use as museums; however, the U.S. Congress remained "deeply concerned" over the loss of naval surface-gunfire support that the battleships provided, and noted, "...navy efforts to improve upon, much less replace, this capability have been highly problematic." Partially as a consequence, Congress passed , the National Defense Authorization Act 2006, requiring that the battleships be kept and maintained in a state of readiness should they ever be needed again. Congress had ordered that the following measures be implemented to ensure that Wisconsin could be returned to active duty if needed:
 She must not be altered in any way that would impair her military utility.
 The battleship must be preserved in her present condition through the continued use of cathodic protection, dehumidification systems, and any other preservation methods as needed.
 Spare parts and unique equipment, such as the  gun barrels and projectiles, must be preserved in adequate numbers to support Wisconsin, if reactivated.
 The Navy must prepare plans for the rapid reactivation of Wisconsin should she be returned to the Navy in the event of a national emergency.
These conditions closely mirror the original three conditions that the Nation Defense Authorization Act of 1996 laid out for the maintenance of Wisconsin while she was in the mothball fleet. These conditions would be unlikely to impede a plan to turn Wisconsin into a permanent museum ship at her berth in Norfolk.

On 14 December 2009, the US Navy officially transferred Wisconsin to the city of Norfolk, ending the requirement for the ship to be preserved for possible recall to active duty. The US Navy had paid the city of Norfolk $2.8 million between 2000 and 2009 to maintain the ship. A formal ceremony transferring the ship to the city of Norfolk took place on 16 April 2010. Wisconsin was listed on the National Register of Historic Places on 28 March 2012.

Awards
Wisconsin earned five battle stars for her World War II service, and one for the Korean War. The ship also received the Combat Action Ribbon and Navy Unit Commendation for actions in the Korean War and Operation Desert Storm in 1991. She also received over a dozen more awards for World War II, the Korean War, and Operations Desert Shield and Desert Storm.

See also

 List of broadsides of major World War II ships
 List of museum ships
 U.S. Navy museums (and other battleship museums)

References

Further reading

 The Floating Drydock. United States Naval Vessels, ONI 222-US, Kresgeville, PA 18333. 
 Polmar, Norman. The Naval Institute Guide to the Ships and Aircraft of the U.S. Fleet. 2001 Naval Institute Press. .

External links

 Nauticus, Norfolk, VA
 NAVSOURCE Photo Gallery: Numerous photographs of USS Wisconsin
 Hampton Roads Naval Museum 
 Operation Desert Storm Timeline
 Maritimequest USS Wisconsin BB-64 Photo Gallery
 USS Wisconsin Photo Gallery and Facts
 USS Wisconsin Association
 
 1995 US General Accounting Office report on the US Navy’s Naval Surface Fire Support program
 2005 US Government Accountability Office Report: Issues Related to Navy Battleships 
 Satellite image of the USS Wisconsin
 
 1956 Booklet of General Plans for the U.S.S. Wisconsin (BB-64), Iowa Class, hosted by the Historical Naval Ships Association (HNSA) Digital Collections

 

Existing battleships
Iowa-class battleships
Ships built in Philadelphia
1943 ships
World War II battleships of the United States
Cold War battleships of the United States
Korean War battleships of the United States
Gulf War ships of the United States
Museum ships in Virginia
Museums in Norfolk, Virginia
Military and war museums in Virginia
Naval museums in the United States
Museums established in 2001
National Register of Historic Places in Norfolk, Virginia
Ships on the National Register of Historic Places in Virginia
World War II on the National Register of Historic Places
Maritime incidents in 1951
Maritime incidents in 1956
Downtown Norfolk, Virginia
Battleship museums in the United States